The 1936 Philadelphia Phillies season was a season in Major League Baseball. The Phillies finished eighth in the National League with a record of 54 wins and 100 losses.

Offseason 
 November 21, 1935: Al Todd was traded by the Phillies to the Pittsburgh Pirates for Claude Passeau and Earl Grace.

Regular season 
 July 10, 1936: Chuck Klein of the Phillies hit four home runs in a ten inning game against the Pittsburgh Pirates at Forbes Field.

Season standings

Record vs. opponents

Notable transactions 
 May 24, 1936: Johnny Vergez was purchased from the Phillies by the St. Louis Cardinals.

Game log

|- style="background:#bfb"
| 1 || April 14 || Bees || 4–1 || Curt Davis (1–0) || Danny MacFayden (0–1) || None || 9,000 || 1–0
|- style="background:#fbb"
| 2 || April 15 || Bees || 4–12 || Ray Benge (1–0) || Joe Bowman (0–1) || None || 2,000 || 1–1
|- style="background:#bfb"
| 3 || April 16 || Bees || 7–5 || Orville Jorgens (1–0) || Tiny Chaplin (0–1) || Syl Johnson (1) || 500 || 2–1
|- style="background:#fbb"
| 4 || April 17 || @ Dodgers || 3–4  || Fred Frankhouse (1–0) || Bucky Walters (0–1) || None || 8,000 || 2–2
|- style="background:#bfb"
| 5 || April 18 || @ Dodgers || 4–1 || Syl Johnson (1–0) || Watty Clark (0–1) || None || 7,500 || 3–2
|- style="background:#fbb"
| 6 || April 19 || @ Dodgers || 1–2 || Van Mungo (1–2) || Curt Davis (1–1) || None || 13,500 || 3–3
|- style="background:#bfb"
| 7 || April 20 || @ Giants || 7–6 || Joe Bowman (1–1) || Slick Castleman (0–1) || None || 6,000 || 4–3
|- style="background:#fbb"
| 8 || April 21 || @ Giants || 6–7 || Harry Gumbert (2–0) || Curt Davis (1–2) || None || 6,000 || 4–4
|- style="background:#fbb"
| 9 || April 22 || @ Giants || 2–7 || Carl Hubbell (2–0) || Euel Moore (0–1) || None || 3,108 || 4–5
|- style="background:#bfb"
| 10 || April 23 || @ Bees || 5–3 || Bucky Walters (1–1) || Bob Brown (0–1) || Syl Johnson (2) || 3,106 || 5–5
|- style="background:#fbb"
| 11 || April 24 || @ Bees || 1–4 || Danny MacFayden (1–2) || Curt Davis (1–3) || None || 9,434 || 5–6
|- style="background:#bfb"
| 12 || April 25 || Dodgers || 3–1 || Joe Bowman (2–1) || Ed Brandt (0–1) || None || 6,000 || 6–6
|- style="background:#fbb"
| 13 || April 26 || Dodgers || 7–10 || Fred Frankhouse (2–0) || Syl Johnson (1–1) || Dutch Leonard (1) || 5,000 || 6–7
|- style="background:#bfb"
| 14 || April 28 || @ Pirates || 9–7 || Syl Johnson (2–1) || Mace Brown (0–1) || None || 2,000 || 7–7
|- style="background:#fbb"
| 15 || April 29 || @ Pirates || 9–10  || Red Lucas (1–1) || Bucky Walters (1–2) || None || 1,000 || 7–8
|- style="background:#fbb"
| 16 || April 30 || @ Pirates || 5–6 || Jim Weaver (2–1) || Orville Jorgens (1–1) || Mace Brown (1) || 1,500 || 7–9
|-

|- style="background:#fbb"
| 17 || May 1 || @ Reds || 3–4 || Lee Grissom (1–0) || Joe Bowman (2–2) || Lee Stine (1) || 1,814 || 7–10
|- style="background:#bfb"
| 18 || May 2 || @ Reds || 4–3 || Bucky Walters (2–2) || Al Hollingsworth (3–1) || Syl Johnson (3) || 2,972 || 8–10
|- style="background:#bfb"
| 19 || May 3 || @ Cubs || 8–5  || Syl Johnson (3–1) || Fabian Kowalik (0–1) || None || 8,000 || 9–10
|- style="background:#bbb"
| – || May 4 || @ Cubs || colspan=6 | Postponed (rain, cold weather and wet grounds); Makeup: July 19 as a traditional double-header
|- style="background:#fbb"
| 20 || May 5 || @ Cubs || 4–5 || Bill Lee (3–1) || Joe Bowman (2–3) || None || 3,906 || 9–11
|- style="background:#fbb"
| 21 || May 6 || @ Cardinals || 2–3 || Dizzy Dean (4–1) || Bucky Walters (2–3) || None || 2,400 || 9–12
|- style="background:#fbb"
| 22 || May 7 || @ Cardinals || 2–3 || Bill Walker (2–0) || Orville Jorgens (1–2) || None || 6,776 || 9–13
|- style="background:#bfb"
| 23 || May 9 || Giants || 5–3 || Curt Davis (2–3) || Carl Hubbell (2–3) || None || 8,000 || 10–13
|- style="background:#fbb"
| 24 || May 10 || Giants || 2–6 || Hal Schumacher (2–1) || Joe Bowman (2–4) || None || 13,000 || 10–14
|- style="background:#fbb"
| 25 || May 11 || Giants || 12–13 || Harry Gumbert (3–0) || Claude Passeau (0–1) || Frank Gabler (1) || 5,000 || 10–15
|- style="background:#fbb"
| 26 || May 12 || Reds || 4–6 || Benny Frey (1–0) || Orville Jorgens (1–3) || None ||  || 10–16
|- style="background:#bfb"
| 27 || May 13 || Reds || 9–7 || Syl Johnson (4–1) || Lee Stine (1–3) || Tom Zachary (1) || 1,500 || 11–16
|- style="background:#bbb"
| – || May 14 || Reds || colspan=6 | Postponed (cold weather and rain); Makeup: June 28 as a traditional double-header
|- style="background:#bfb"
| 28 || May 15 || Cubs || 11–6 || Euel Moore (1–1) || Charlie Root (1–2) || None ||  || 12–16
|- style="background:#fbb"
| 29 || May 16 || Cubs || 3–7 || Roy Henshaw (1–3) || Bucky Walters (2–4) || None || 7,500 || 12–17
|- style="background:#fbb"
| 30 || May 17 || Cardinals || 3–10 || Dizzy Dean (5–2) || Curt Davis (2–4) || None || 15,000 || 12–18
|- style="background:#fbb"
| 31 || May 18 || Cardinals || 6–11 || Mike Ryba (2–1) || Orville Jorgens (1–4) || Paul Dean (1) || 3,000 || 12–19
|- style="background:#bbb"
| – || May 19 || Cardinals || colspan=6 | Postponed (rain and wet grounds); Makeup: June 25 as a traditional double-header
|- style="background:#fbb"
| 32 || May 20 || Pirates || 3–9 || Jim Weaver (5–1) || Tom Zachary (0–1) || None || 1,500 || 12–20
|- style="background:#fbb"
| 33 || May 21 || Pirates || 4–7 || Ralph Birkofer (3–1) || Orville Jorgens (1–5) || None || 1,500 || 12–21
|- style="background:#bfb"
| 34 || May 22 || @ Giants || 15–0 || Bucky Walters (3–4) ||  || None || 4,468 || 13–21
|- style="background:#fbb"
| 35 || May 23 || @ Giants || 0–9 || Carl Hubbell (5–3) || Hal Kelleher (0–1) || None || 13,468 || 13–22
|- style="background:#fbb"
| 36 || May 24 || @ Giants || 5–13 || Hal Schumacher (5–1) || Tom Zachary (0–2) || Frank Gabler (3) || 20,000 || 13–23
|- style="background:#fbb"
| 37 || May 25 || @ Giants || 0–1 || Al Smith (4–2) || Joe Bowman (2–5) || None || 3,000 || 13–24
|- style="background:#bfb"
| 38 || May 26 || Bees || 7–2 || Orville Jorgens (2–5) || Ray Benge (4–2) || None || 2,000 || 14–24
|- style="background:#bfb"
| 39 || May 27 || Bees || 5–2 || Bucky Walters (4–4) || Bobby Reis (1–3) || None || 1,500 || 15–24
|- style="background:#fbb"
| 40 || May 28 || Dodgers || 10–13 || George Jeffcoat (1–1) || Tom Zachary (0–3) || Ed Brandt (2) || 1,000 || 15–25
|- style="background:#bfb"
| 41 || May 29 || Dodgers || 10–2 || Euel Moore (2–1) || Fred Frankhouse (2–6) || None || 2,500 || 16–25
|- style="background:#bfb"
| 42 || May 30  || @ Bees || 5–4  || Claude Passeau (1–1) || Johnny Lanning (2–2) || None ||  || 17–25
|- style="background:#bfb"
| 43 || May 30  || @ Bees || 9–6 || Joe Bowman (3–5) || Tiny Chaplin (2–5) || None || 24,430 || 18–25
|- style="background:#fbb"
| 44 || May 31 || @ Bees || 5–6  || Danny MacFayden (7–5) || Syl Johnson (4–2) || None || 10,000 || 18–26
|-

|- style="background:#fbb"
| 45 || June 2 || @ Reds || 8–9 || Don Brennan (2–1) || Joe Bowman (3–6) || None || 19,173 || 18–27
|- style="background:#fbb"
| 46 || June 4 || @ Reds || 3–5 || Paul Derringer (5–5) || Hal Kelleher (0–2) || Don Brennan (4) || 1,377 || 18–28
|- style="background:#fbb"
| 47 || June 5 || @ Pirates || 8–14 || Mace Brown (2–1) || Joe Bowman (3–7) || None || 1,000 || 18–29
|- style="background:#bfb"
| 48 || June 6 || @ Pirates || 5–1 || Orville Jorgens (3–5) || Jim Weaver (7–3) || None || 5,000 || 19–29
|- style="background:#fbb"
| 49 || June 7 || @ Pirates || 2–6 || Bill Swift (5–3) || Euel Moore (2–2) || None || 10,000 || 19–30
|- style="background:#fbb"
| 50 || June 8 || @ Cubs || 0–3 || Larry French (3–1) || Bucky Walters (4–5) || None || 3,500 || 19–31
|- style="background:#fbb"
| 51 || June 9 || @ Cubs || 3–6 || Roy Henshaw (4–3) || Hal Kelleher (0–3) || None || 3,733 || 19–32
|- style="background:#fbb"
| 52 || June 10 || @ Cubs || 3–4 || Lon Warneke (6–3) || Fabian Kowalik (0–3) || None || 2,000 || 19–33
|- style="background:#bfb"
| 53 || June 11 || @ Cardinals || 12–4 || Claude Passeau (2–1) || Les Munns (0–2) || None || 2,350 || 20–33
|- style="background:#fbb"
| 54 || June 12 || @ Cardinals || 2–3  || Roy Parmelee (6–5) || Bucky Walters (4–6) || None || 2,000 || 20–34
|- style="background:#fbb"
| 55 || June 13 || @ Cardinals || 1–7 || Dizzy Dean (12–2) || Hal Kelleher (0–4) || None || 4,986 || 20–35
|- style="background:#fbb"
| 56 || June 14 || @ Cardinals || 10–12 || Bill Walker (4–2) || Claude Passeau (2–2) || Dizzy Dean (2) || 10,200 || 20–36
|- style="background:#fbb"
| 57 || June 16 || Cubs || 1–4 || Larry French (4–1) || Fabian Kowalik (0–4) || None || 2,500 || 20–37
|- style="background:#fbb"
| 58 || June 17 || Cubs || 3–5 || Lon Warneke (8–3) || Bucky Walters (4–7) || Larry French (1) || 2,500 || 20–38
|- style="background:#bbb"
| – || June 18 || Cubs || colspan=6 | Postponed (wet grounds and rain); Makeup: July 26 as a traditional double-header
|- style="background:#bbb"
| – || June 19 || Pirates || colspan=6 | Postponed (wet grounds and rain); Makeup: June 20 as a traditional double-header
|- style="background:#fbb"
| 59 || June 20  || Pirates || 0–6 || Cy Blanton (5–4) || Joe Bowman (3–8) || None ||  || 20–39
|- style="background:#bfb"
| 60 || June 20  || Pirates || 2–1 || Orville Jorgens (4–5) || Jim Weaver (8–5) || Syl Johnson (4) || 8,000 || 21–39
|- style="background:#fbb"
| 61 || June 21 || Pirates || 6–7 || Red Lucas (5–1) || Fabian Kowalik (0–5) || None || 5,000 || 21–40
|- style="background:#fbb"
| 62 || June 22 || Cardinals || 6–8 || Jesse Haines (1–0) || Claude Passeau (2–3) || Dizzy Dean (3) || 2,500 || 21–41
|- style="background:#fbb"
| 63 || June 23 || Cardinals || 2–3 || Ed Heusser (2–1) || Joe Bowman (3–9) || Dizzy Dean (4) || 2,500 || 21–42
|- style="background:#bbb"
| – || June 24 || Cardinals || colspan=6 | Postponed (wet grounds and rain); Makeup: August 2 as a traditional double-header
|- style="background:#bfb"
| 64 || June 25  || Cardinals || 13–4 || Fabian Kowalik (1–5) || Dizzy Dean (13–3) || Syl Johnson (5) ||  || 22–42
|- style="background:#fbb"
| 65 || June 25  || Cardinals || 4–13 || Jesse Haines (2–0) || Orville Jorgens (4–6) || None || 14,000 || 22–43
|- style="background:#fbb"
| 66 || June 26 || Reds || 6–11 || Al Hollingsworth (8–4) || Bucky Walters (4–8) || None || 2,500 || 22–44
|- style="background:#fbb"
| 67 || June 27 || Reds || 9–10 || Don Brennan (4–1) || Syl Johnson (4–3) || Paul Derringer (2) || 1,500 || 22–45
|- style="background:#bbb"
| – || June 28  || Reds || colspan=6 | Postponed (rain); Makeup: July 29 as a traditional double-header
|- style="background:#bbb"
| – || June 28  || Reds || colspan=6 | Postponed (rain); Makeup: July 31 as a traditional double-header
|- style="background:#bbb"
| – || June 30 || @ Dodgers || colspan=6 | Postponed (wet grounds and rain); Makeup: July 1 as a traditional double-header
|-

|- style="background:#fbb"
| 68 || July 1  || @ Dodgers || 1–6 || Van Mungo (8–10) || Fabian Kowalik (1–6) || None ||  || 22–46
|- style="background:#bfb"
| 69 || July 1  || @ Dodgers || 10–3 || Orville Jorgens (5–6) || Ed Brandt (3–7) || Syl Johnson (6) || 10,000 || 23–46
|- style="background:#bfb"
| 70 || July 2 || @ Dodgers || 5–0 || Bucky Walters (5–8) || Fred Frankhouse (4–7) || None || 797 || 24–46
|- style="background:#bfb"
| 71 || July 4  || Dodgers || 9–5 || Joe Bowman (4–9) || Ed Brandt (3–8) || Euel Moore (1) ||  || 25–46
|- style="background:#bfb"
| 72 || July 4  || Dodgers || 4–0 || Claude Passeau (3–3) || Watty Clark (3–8) || None || 15,000 || 26–46
|- style="background:#bfb"
| 73 || July 5 || Bees || 7–6 || Orville Jorgens (6–6) || Ray Benge (6–7) || Claude Passeau (1) ||  || 27–46
|- style="background:#bbcaff;"
| – || July 7 ||colspan="7" | 1936 Major League Baseball All-Star Game at National League Park in Boston
|- style="background:#fbb"
| 74 || July 9 || @ Pirates || 5–16 || Ralph Birkofer (4–3) || Fabian Kowalik (1–7) || None || 3,500 || 27–47
|- style="background:#bfb"
| 75 || July 10 || @ Pirates || 9–6  || Bucky Walters (6–8) || Bill Swift (8–6) || None || 2,500 || 28–47
|- style="background:#bbb"
| – || July 11 || @ Pirates || colspan=6 | Postponed (rain); Makeup: September 2 as a traditional double-header
|- style="background:#bfb"
| 76 || July 12  || @ Reds || 4–0 || Joe Bowman (5–9) || Paul Derringer (11–10) || Claude Passeau (2) ||  || 29–47
|- style="background:#fbb"
| 77 || July 12  || @ Reds || 3–4  || Don Brennan (5–1) || Claude Passeau (3–4) || None || 4,018 || 29–48
|- style="background:#fbb"
| 78 || July 13 || @ Reds || 4–6 || Benny Frey (3–1) || Bucky Walters (6–9) || Peaches Davis (1) || 600 || 29–49
|- style="background:#bfb"
| 79 || July 14 || @ Reds || 9–8 || Pete Sivess (1–0) || Bill Hallahan (3–4) || None || 747 || 30–49
|- style="background:#bfb"
| 80 || July 15 || @ Cardinals || 5–4 || Claude Passeau (4–4) || Ed Heusser (4–2) || Syl Johnson (7) || 13,854 || 31–49
|- style="background:#bfb"
| 81 || July 16 || @ Cardinals || 6–2 || Claude Passeau (5–4) || Dizzy Dean (14–6) || None || 1,800 || 32–49
|- style="background:#fbb"
| 82 || July 17 || @ Cardinals || 4–5 || Dizzy Dean (15–6) || Syl Johnson (4–4) || None || 1,800 || 32–50
|- style="background:#fbb"
| 83 || July 18 || @ Cubs || 6–8 || Larry French (9–1) || Orville Jorgens (6–7) || None || 7,000 || 32–51
|- style="background:#fbb"
| 84 || July 19  || @ Cubs || 1–2  || Bill Lee (10–5) || Bucky Walters (6–10) || None ||  || 32–52
|- style="background:#bfb"
| 85 || July 19  || @ Cubs || 4–1 || Claude Passeau (6–4) || Tex Carleton (9–4) || None || 29,540 || 33–52
|- style="background:#fbb"
| 86 || July 21 || Pirates || 6–17 || Bill Swift (9–8) || Euel Moore (2–3) || None || 2,500 || 33–53
|- style="background:#bfb"
| 87 || July 22 || Pirates || 16–4 || Joe Bowman (6–9) || Mace Brown (5–6) || None ||  || 34–53
|- style="background:#fbb"
| 88 || July 23 || Pirates || 1–10 || Cy Blanton (7–8) || Claude Passeau (6–5) || None || 2,500 || 34–54
|- style="background:#bbb"
| – || July 24 || Pirates || colspan=6 | Postponed (rain); Makeup: September 13 as a traditional double-header
|- style="background:#fbb"
| 89 || July 25 || Cubs || 4–17 || Curt Davis (10–8) || Bucky Walters (6–11) || None || 6,000 || 34–55
|- style="background:#bfb"
| 90 || July 26  || Cubs || 4–0 || Bucky Walters (7–11) || Larry French (10–2) || None ||  || 35–55
|- style="background:#fbb"
| 91 || July 26  || Cubs || 5–18 || Lon Warneke (11–6) || Joe Bowman (6–10) || None || 20,000 || 35–56
|- style="background:#bbb"
| – || July 27 || Cubs || colspan=6 | Postponed (wet grounds, rain, threatening weather); Makeup: September 9 as a traditional double-header
|- style="background:#bfb"
| 92 || July 28 || Cubs || 5–3 || Claude Passeau (7–5) || Larry French (10–3) || None || 4,000 || 36–56
|- style="background:#bbb"
| – || July 29  || Reds || colspan=6 | Postponed (wet grounds and rain); Makeup: July 30 as a traditional double-header
|- style="background:#bbb"
| – || July 29  || Reds || colspan=6 | Postponed (wet grounds and rain); Makeup: September 12 as a traditional double-header
|- style="background:#fbb"
| 93 || July 30  || Reds || 0–5 || Bill Hallahan (4–5) || Joe Bowman (6–11) || None ||  || 36–57
|- style="background:#bfb"
| 94 || July 30  || Reds || 5–4 || Ray Benge (8–9) || Al Hollingsworth (9–5) || Claude Passeau (3) || 4,500 || 37–57
|- style="background:#fbb"
| 95 || July 31  || Reds || 2–12 || Peaches Davis (2–3) || Bucky Walters (7–12) || None ||  || 37–58
|- style="background:#bfb"
| 96 || July 31  || Reds || 7–2 || Orville Jorgens (7–7) || Don Brennan (5–2) || Joe Bowman (1) || 5,000 || 38–58
|-

|- style="background:#bfb"
| 97 || August 1 || Cardinals || 11–3 || Claude Passeau (8–5) || Roy Parmelee (9–7) || None || 10,000 || 39–58
|- style="background:#fbb"
| 98 || August 2  || Cardinals || 4–13 || Jesse Haines (6–1) || Bucky Walters (7–13) || None ||  || 39–59
|- style="background:#fbb"
| 99 || August 2  || Cardinals || 8–11 || George Earnshaw (6–10) || Joe Bowman (6–12) || Dizzy Dean (7) || 25,000 || 39–60
|- style="background:#fbb"
| 100 || August 4 || Dodgers || 5–6 || Watty Clark (7–11) || Joe Bowman (6–13) || Max Butcher (2) || 2,000 || 39–61
|- style="background:#fbb"
| 101 || August 5 || Dodgers || 3–7 || Ed Brandt (6–11) || Claude Passeau (8–6) || None || 1,200 || 39–62
|- style="background:#bbb"
| – || August 6 || Dodgers || colspan=6 | Postponed (rain and wet grounds); Makeup: September 5 as a traditional double-header
|- style="background:#fbb"
| 102 || August 7 || Giants || 3–9 || Al Smith (11–8) || Bucky Walters (7–14) || Dick Coffman (3) || 6,000 || 39–63
|- style="background:#fbb"
| 103 || August 8 || Giants || 2–3 || Carl Hubbell (16–6) || Joe Bowman (6–14) || None || 5,000 || 39–64
|- style="background:#fbb"
| 104 || August 9 || Giants || 2–6 || Slick Castleman (3–7) || Claude Passeau (8–7) || None || 7,000 || 39–65
|- style="background:#fbb"
| 105 || August 10 || Bees || 7–9 || Bill Weir (1–0) || Claude Passeau (8–8) || Bob Smith (7) || 1,000 || 39–66
|- style="background:#fbb"
| 106 || August 11 || Bees || 4–5  || Bobby Reis (5–5) || Syl Johnson (4–5) || None ||  || 39–67
|- style="background:#fbb"
| 107 || August 12 || Bees || 2–4 || Guy Bush (2–4) || Pete Sivess (1–1) || None ||  || 39–68
|- style="background:#fbb"
| 108 || August 13 || @ Giants || 4–6 || Al Smith (12–8) || Joe Bowman (6–15) || None || 18,000 || 39–69
|- style="background:#fbb"
| 109 || August 14 || @ Giants || 0–3 || Slick Castleman (4–7) || Claude Passeau (8–9) || None || 5,000 || 39–70
|- style="background:#fbb"
| 110 || August 15 || @ Giants || 1–4 || Carl Hubbell (17–6) || Bucky Walters (7–15) || None || 8,000 || 39–71
|- style="background:#fbb"
| 111 || August 16 || @ Giants || 3–6 || Hal Schumacher (9–9) || Ray Benge (8–10) || Dick Coffman (4) || 15,000 || 39–72
|- style="background:#bfb"
| 112 || August 18 || @ Bees || 7–0 || Claude Passeau (9–9) || Johnny Lanning (3–10) || None || 1,700 || 40–72
|- style="background:#fbb"
| 113 || August 19 || @ Bees || 1–9 || Tiny Chaplin (7–11) || Bucky Walters (7–16) || None || 1,800 || 40–73
|- style="background:#fbb"
| 114 || August 20 || @ Bees || 1–3 || Bobby Reis (6–5) || Joe Bowman (6–16) || None || 1,500 || 40–74
|- style="background:#fbb"
| 115 || August 22 || @ Dodgers || 3–12 || Ed Brandt (7–11) || Claude Passeau (9–10) || None || 3,000 || 40–75
|- style="background:#fbb"
| 116 || August 23  || @ Dodgers || 5–6 || George Jeffcoat (5–3) || Claude Passeau (9–11) || Watty Clark (2) ||  || 40–76
|- style="background:#bfb"
| 117 || August 23  || @ Dodgers || 5–3 || Bucky Walters (8–16) || Van Mungo (12–16) || None || 12,000 || 41–76
|- style="background:#bbb"
| – || August 25 || @ Cubs || colspan=6 | Postponed (rain); Makeup: August 26 as a traditional double-header
|- style="background:#fbb"
| 118 || August 26  || @ Cubs || 2–4 || Bill Lee (14–8) || Claude Passeau (9–12) || None ||  || 41–77
|- style="background:#fbb"
| 119 || August 26  || @ Cubs || 4–7 || Larry French (16–5) || Joe Bowman (6–17) || None || 10,000 || 41–78
|- style="background:#fbb"
| 120 || August 27 || @ Cubs || 0–1 || Roy Henshaw (6–4) || Syl Johnson (4–6) || None ||  || 41–79
|- style="background:#bfb"
| 121 || August 28 || @ Cardinals || 8–0 || Bucky Walters (9–16) || Cotton Pippen (0–1) || None || 1,500 || 42–79
|- style="background:#fbb"
| 122 || August 29 || @ Cardinals || 3–12 || Si Johnson (3–2) || Ray Benge (8–11) || None || 2,700 || 42–80
|- style="background:#fbb"
| 123 ||  || @ Reds || 3–6 || Paul Derringer (16–17) || Joe Bowman (6–18) || None ||  || 42–81
|- style="background:#fbb"
| 124 || August 30  || @ Reds || 3–4 || Peaches Davis (5–6) || Syl Johnson (4–7) || None || 7,754 || 42–82
|-

|- style="background:#fbb"
| 125 || September 1 || @ Reds || 2–3 || Benny Frey (9–5) || Bucky Walters (9–17) || None || 1,074 || 42–83
|- style="background:#bbb"
| – || September 2  || @ Pirates || colspan=6 | Postponed (rain); Makeup: September 3 as a traditional double-header
|- style="background:#bbb"
| – || September 2  || @ Pirates || colspan=6 | Postponed (rain); Makeup: September 14 as a traditional double-header in Philadlephia
|- style="background:#bfb"
| 126 || September 3  || @ Pirates || 4–3 || Joe Bowman (7–18) || Red Lucas (12–4) || None ||  || 43–83
|- style="background:#fbb"
| 127 || September 3  || @ Pirates || 1–5 || Waite Hoyt (5–3) || Claude Passeau (9–13) || None || 5,000 || 43–84
|- style="background:#fbb"
| 128 || September 5  || Dodgers || 2–3 || Ed Brandt (9–12) || Bucky Walters (9–18) || None ||  || 43–85
|- style="background:#fbb"
| 129 || September 5  || Dodgers || 3–4  || Max Butcher (5–4) || Claude Passeau (9–14) || None || 6,000 || 43–86
|- style="background:#bfb"
| 130 || September 6 || Dodgers || 7–5 || Pete Sivess (2–1) || George Jeffcoat (5–4) || None || 3,000 || 44–86
|- style="background:#fbb"
| 131 || September 7  || Giants || 2–6 || Carl Hubbell (22–6) || Joe Bowman (7–19) || None ||  || 44–87
|- style="background:#fbb"
| 132 || September 7  || Giants || 11–14 || Dick Coffman (7–5) || Bucky Walters (9–19) || None || 23,000 || 44–88
|- style="background:#fbb"
| 133 || September 9  || Cubs || 3–10 || Larry French (18–6) || Ray Benge (8–12) || None ||  || 44–89
|- style="background:#bfb"
| 134 || September 9  || Cubs || 5–4  || Pete Sivess (3–1) || Tex Carleton (13–10) || None ||  || 45–89
|- style="background:#fbb"
| 135 || September 10 || Cubs || 2–3 || Bill Lee (15–11) || Bucky Walters (9–20) || None ||  || 45–90
|- style="background:#bfb"
| 136 || September 11 || Reds || 9–6 || Syl Johnson (5–7) || Bill Hallahan (6–9) || None || 500 || 46–90
|- style="background:#bfb"
| 137 || September 12  || Reds || 7–1 ||  || Peaches Davis (7–7) || Ray Benge (1) ||  || 47–90
|- style="background:#bfb"
| 138 || September 12  || Reds || 7–2 || Joe Bowman (8–19) || Al Hollingsworth (9–9) || None || 4,000 || 48–90
|- style="background:#fbb"
| 139 || September 13  || Pirates || 3–5 || Ralph Birkofer (7–5) || Pete Sivess (3–2) || Cy Blanton (3) ||  || 48–91
|- style="background:#bfb"
| 140 || September 13  || Pirates || 4–3 || Orville Jorgens (8–7) || Mace Brown (9–10) || None || 7,500 || 49–91
|- style="background:#fbb"
| 141 || September 14  || Pirates || 4–11 || Bill Swift (15–15) || Ray Benge (8–13) || None ||  || 49–92
|- style="background:#fbb"
| 142 || September 14  || Pirates || 5–6  || Red Lucas (13–4) || Joe Bowman (8–20) || None || 1,000 || 49–93
|- style="background:#bbb"
| – || September 15 || Cardinals || colspan=6 | Postponed (rain); Makeup: September 16 as a traditional double-header
|- style="background:#bfb"
| 143 || September 16  || Cardinals || 7–3 || Bucky Walters (10–20) || Jesse Haines (7–5) || None ||  || 50–93
|- style="background:#fbb"
| 144 || September 16  || Cardinals || 2–5 || Si Johnson (5–3) ||  || Dizzy Dean (10) || 5,000 || 50–94
|- style="background:#fbb"
| 145 || September 19 || @ Bees || 0–5 || Bill Weir (3–3) || Pete Sivess (3–3) || None || 2,274 || 50–95
|- style="background:#fbb"
| 146 ||  || @ Bees || 3–5 || Danny MacFayden (17–12) || Orville Jorgens (8–8) || None ||  || 50–96
|- style="background:#fbb"
| 147 || September 20  || @ Bees || 5–6 || Bob Smith (6–7) || Hugh Mulcahy (0–1) || None || 7,000 || 50–97
|- style="background:#bbb"
| – || September 21 || Giants || colspan=6 | Postponed (wet grounds and rain); Makeup: September 22 as a traditional double-header
|- style="background:#bfb"
| 148 || September 22  || Giants || 11–7 || Joe Bowman (9–20) || Al Smith (14–12) || None ||  || 51–97
|- style="background:#bfb"
| 149 || September 22  || Giants || 6–2 || Bucky Walters (11–20) || Frank Gabler (9–7) || None || 4,000 || 52–97
|- style="background:#fbb"
| 150 || September 23 || Giants || 4–5 || Carl Hubbell (26–6) || Pete Sivess (3–4) || None || 2,500 || 52–98
|- style="background:#bfb"
| 151 || September 24  || @ Dodgers || 4–2  || Hugh Mulcahy (1–1) || Hank Winston (1–3) || None ||  || 53–98
|- style="background:#fbb"
| 152 || September 24  || @ Dodgers || 2–4  || Harry Eisenstat (1–2) || Hal Kelleher (0–5) || None || 1,700 || 53–99
|- style="background:#fbb"
| 153 || September 27  || Bees || 3–7 || Guy Bush (5–8) || Bucky Walters (11–21) || None ||  || 53–100
|- style="background:#bfb"
| 154 || September 27  || Bees || 4–3 || Claude Passeau (11–15) || Ben Cantwell (9–9) || None || 5,000 || 54–100
|-

| style="text-align:left;" |
The original schedule indicated single games on June 3 and July 12 at Cincinnati which became a double-header on July 12.
The original schedule indicated single games on August 21 and 23 at Brooklyn which became a double-header on August 23.
The original schedule indicated single games on August 30 and 31 at Cincinnati which became a double-header on August 30.
The original schedule indicated single games on September 21 and 23 at Boston which became a double-header on September 23.
The original schedule indicated single games on September 24 and 25 at Brooklyn which became a double-header on September 24.
The original schedule indicated single games on September 26 and 27 with Boston which became a double-header on September 27.

Roster

Player stats

Batting

Starters by position 
Note: Pos = Position; G = Games played; AB = At bats; H = Hits; Avg. = Batting average; HR = Home runs; RBI = Runs batted in

Other batters 
Note: G = Games played; AB = At bats; H = Hits; Avg. = Batting average; HR = Home runs; RBI = Runs batted in

Pitching

Starting pitchers 
Note: G = Games pitched; IP = Innings pitched; W = Wins; L = Losses; ERA = Earned run average; SO = Strikeouts

Other pitchers 
Note: G = Games pitched; IP = Innings pitched; W = Wins; L = Losses; ERA = Earned run average; SO = Strikeouts

Relief pitchers 
Note: G = Games pitched; W = Wins; L = Losses; SV = Saves; ERA = Earned run average; SO = Strikeouts

Farm system

Notes

References 
1936 Philadelphia Phillies season at Baseball Reference

Philadelphia Phillies seasons
Philadelphia Phillies season
Philly